Fencing at the 22nd Southeast Asian Games was held in Cau Giay Gymnasium, Hanoi, Vietnam.

Medal summary

Men's events

Women's events

External links 
 Result

2003
2003 Southeast Asian Games events
2003 in fencing
Fencing competitions in Vietnam